Lechnica is a village and municipality in Kežmarok District in the Prešov Region of north Slovakia.

History
In historical records the village was first mentioned in 1319.

Geography
The municipality lies at an altitude of 490 metres and covers an area of 12.525 km².
It has a population of about 315 people.

References

External links
https://web.archive.org/web/20170329163108/http://lechnica.e-obce.sk/

Villages and municipalities in Kežmarok District